Amos Leonard Boon Hock Chye (born 12 July 1972) is a former goalkeeper who last played for Woodlands Wellington in the 2011 S-League season. He was retired professionally at the end of the season.

Boon is a former Singapore youth international and Combined Schools player. He has also represented Singapore in the Tiger 5 Futsal tournament playing against the likes of Brazil.

Football career
Boon started his S.League career with Tanjong Pagar United in 1996, which he stayed for three years. He then moved to Marine Castle United for five years.

He had a brief stint at Home United for two years where he played against the likes of Selangor (Malaysia), Valencia FC (Maldives) and Happy Valley (Hong Kong) in the AFC Cup, before returning to Sengkang Punggol. He played for 7.5 years with Sengkang Punggol  before joining Geylang United for the 2008 season. Many fans were shocked at the move as it was speculated that he would stay at Sengkang and end his career at the Hougang Stadium.. He returned to Hougang United for another two years before ending his career at Woodlands Wellington in 2011.

Wakeboard career
During recovery from an injury in 1999, Boon started wakeboarding. In 2002, Boon became a member of the national wakeboarding team.

In 2003, Boon became the president of the Wakeboard Association (Singapore).

In 2004, Boon participated in the Asian X Games in wakeboarding and reached the semi-finals.

Boon also co-founded a wakeboarding school, Launch Wakeboard School.

Professional career

In 2006, Boon started Launch Group, an events management agency, initially organising wakeboarding events. The company eventually change to manage artists, product launches, local and overseas conferences.

Boon filed for bankruptcy in October 2022.

References

External links
 

1972 births
Living people
Singaporean footballers
Singapore Premier League players
Singaporean sportspeople of Chinese descent
Association football goalkeepers
Tanjong Pagar United FC players
Hougang United FC players
Home United FC players
Geylang International FC players
Woodlands Wellington FC players